Wesley Hudson da Silva (born 15 April 2000), known simply as Wesley, is a Brazilian professional footballer who plays as a midfielder for Juventude.

Club career
Born in Juiz de Fora, Minas Gerais, Wesley joined Atlético Mineiro's youth setup in 2019 from his hometown club Tupi. He received an emergency call up to the first-team squad ahead of a Série A match against Athletico Paranaense on 18 November 2020, after several players of the team had tested positive for COVID-19. He came on as a last-minute substitute for his U20s teammate Talison, who had been picked for the match under the same circumstances, as Atlético suffered a 2–0 home defeat.

Honours
Atlético Mineiro
Campeonato Brasileiro Sub-20: 2020

References

External links

2000 births
Living people
People from Juiz de Fora
Brazilian footballers
Association football midfielders
Campeonato Brasileiro Série A players
Campeonato Brasileiro Série B players
Campeonato Brasileiro Série C players
Clube Atlético Mineiro players
Grêmio Esportivo Brasil players
Villa Nova Atlético Clube players
Paysandu Sport Club players
Esporte Clube Juventude players
Sportspeople from Minas Gerais